Shakir Zufayri Ibrahim is a Malaysian footballer who plays for Hanelang in the Malaysia FAM League as a midfielder.

References

External links 
 

Living people
Malaysian footballers
Association football midfielders
1995 births
Terengganu F.C. II players